Iryna Vitaliïvna Amshennikova (born 19 May 1986) is a Ukrainian backstroke swimmer. She had her best achievements in short course competitions, where she won bronze at the 2002 FINA World Swimming Championships (25 m) in the 200 m backstroke and six medals, including one gold, at the European Short Course Swimming Championships. She also competed at the 2004 and 2008 Summer Olympics in several events, but was eliminated in the preliminaries. During her career she set 29 national records in the 50–200 m backstroke and various relay events.

Biography
Amshennikova was born in Komsomolsk, Ukraine, to Olga Oleksandrovna, a competitive swimmer, and Vitali Alekseevich, an amateur track and orienteering athlete. Her brother Eugene started with swimming but then became a competitive shooter. In 1997, her local pool was closed for reparations and Iryna moved to Kyiv, where she studied and trained in a boarding school. In 2004, she relocated to Zaporizhia to train with the coach Anatoly Zhuravlev. She graduated from the National University of Physical Education and Sports of Ukraine.

References

External links
 

1986 births
Living people
Olympic swimmers of Ukraine
Swimmers at the 2008 Summer Olympics
Swimmers at the 2004 Summer Olympics
Ukrainian female backstroke swimmers
Medalists at the FINA World Swimming Championships (25 m)
European Aquatics Championships medalists in swimming
Universiade medalists in swimming
Universiade bronze medalists for Ukraine
Medalists at the 2005 Summer Universiade
People from Horishni Plavni
Sportspeople from Poltava Oblast
21st-century Ukrainian women